William Raymond Parsons (born August 17, 1948) is an American former professional baseball player, a , , right-handed pitcher from Riverside, California, where he attended Riverside Polytechnic High School. He played four seasons in the major leagues.

Baseball career
Parsons was drafted in the 7th round by the Seattle Pilots in 1968, and played in their minor league system.

He joined the Milwaukee Brewers in 1970, and was assigned to Portland of the Pacific Coast League, going 3–0 with a 2.25 ERA. Parsons played his first game in the major leagues on April 13, 1971.  He was in the starting rotation for the last-place Brewers in his rookie season, going 13–17 with a 3.20 ERA, while 7th in the league with 4 shutouts and 8th in the AL with 93 walks.  Parsons was second in the 1971 BBWAA Rookie of the Year voting, losing out to Chris Chambliss, and was named The Sporting News AL Rookie Pitcher of the Year.

He saw little game time for the remainder of his career. He was traded to the Oakland Athletics with cash for Deron Johnson in 1974. His contract was purchased by the St. Louis Cardinals from the Athletics at the Winter Meetings on December 2, 1974. In July 1975 he was traded by the Cardinals with cash to the White Sox for Buddy Bradford.

References

External links

Baseball Reference (Minors)
Baseball Gauge
Retrosheet
Venezuelan Professional Baseball League

1948 births
Living people
Arizona Instructional League Pilots players
Baseball players from Riverside, California
Billings Mustangs players
Clinton Pilots players
Denver Bears players
Leones del Caracas players
American expatriate baseball players in Venezuela
Major League Baseball pitchers
Milwaukee Brewers players
Newark Co-Pilots players
Oakland Athletics players
Portland Beavers players
Riverside City Tigers baseball players
Sacramento Solons players
Tucson Toros players
Tulsa Oilers (baseball) players
American expatriate baseball players in Panama
Riverside Polytechnic High School alumni